David Allan Gibson (born November 5, 1977) is a former American football safety in the National Football League.

High school career
Gibson prepped at Mater Dei High School in Santa Ana.

College career
Gibson played college football at the University of Southern California.

Professional career
Gibson played in the NFL for the Tampa Bay Buccaneers and Indianapolis Colts between 2000 and 2003.  He was a sixth round selection (193rd overall pick) in the 2000 NFL Draft.

References

External links
NFL.com player page
TSN player profile

1977 births
Living people
Sportspeople from Santa Ana, California
American football safeties
USC Trojans football players
Indianapolis Colts players
Tampa Bay Buccaneers players